Thomas O'Gorman (May 1, 1843 – September 18, 1921) was an American prelate of the Roman Catholic Church. He served as Bishop of Sioux Falls from 1896 until his death in 1921.

Biography
Thomas O'Gorman was born in Boston, Massachusetts, to John and Margaret (née O'Keefe) O'Gorman. He and his parents moved to Chicago, Illinois, when he was still a child, and then to Saint Paul, Minnesota. In 1853 he and John Ireland were chosen by Bishop Joseph Crétin to study for the priesthood in France. Upon his return to Minnesota, O'Gorman was ordained a priest on November 5, 1865. He then served as pastor of St. John Church in Rochester until 1878, when he joined the Paulist Fathers in their missionary work in New York and also served as a curate at St. Paul Church.

He returned to Minnesota in 1882 and was then appointed pastor of Immaculate Conception Church at Faribault. In 1885 he became the first president of the newly established College of St. Thomas, where he also served as professor of dogmatic theology. He was named professor of church history at Catholic University of America in Washington, D.C. in 1890. During his tenure at Washington, he wrote A History of the Roman Catholic Church in the United States.

On January 24, 1896, O'Gorman was appointed the second Bishop of Sioux Falls, South Dakota, by Pope Leo XIII. He received his episcopal consecration on the following April 19 from Cardinal Francesco Satolli, with Bishops John Joseph Keane and Martin Marty, O.S.B., serving as co-consecrators, at St. Patrick Catholic Church in Washington, D.C. He was later installed at Sioux Falls on May 1, 1896. During his 25-year-long tenure, he increased the number of priests and Catholics in the diocese, and erected numerous churches, schools, and hospitals. He dedicated St. Joseph's Cathedral in 1919, and founded Columbus College in 1921. O'Gorman died from a stroke in Sioux Falls on September 18, 1921, at age 78.

O'Gorman Catholic High School in Sioux Falls is named in his honor.

References

1843 births
1921 deaths
Catholic University of America faculty
Clergy from Boston
Roman Catholic Archdiocese of Saint Paul and Minneapolis
Catholic Church in Minnesota
Roman Catholic bishops of Sioux Falls
19th-century Roman Catholic bishops in the United States
20th-century Roman Catholic bishops in the United States